Alice Kinloch was a South African human rights activist, a public speaker, and a writer who co-founded the African Association in London in 1897, and was the inspiration for the Pan-African Conference in London in 1900.

Life 
Alice Victoria Alexander Kinloch was born in Cape Town, South Africa in 1863. Her family moved to Kimberley around the 1870s. In the month of June 1885, she married Edmund Ndosa Kinloch at St Cyprian's Church in Kimberley.

She travelled to the United Kingdom in 1895 and allied herself with the Aborigines Protection Society (APS), a leading abolitionist and human rights organization. As a representative of the APS, she spoke to large audiences in London, Newcastle, York, and Manchester. On platforms in Britain, she discussed conditions in South Africa. Her topic was the "ill treatment of the indigenous people throughout South Africa, particularly the Compound System found throughout the mining districts".

Later, she published a pamphlet called "Are South African Diamonds Worth Their Cost?". As part of that report, she described conditions of life on mining compounds as "slave-like" and argued against pass laws in Natal.

Kinloch formed the African Association in 1897 with aspirant lawyers Henry Sylvester Williams and Thomas John Thompson from Trinidad and Sierra Leone. As treasurer of the African Association, Kinloch returned to South Africa in February 1898 and, with the African Association, organized the first Pan-African Conference in 1900.

References 

1863 births
People from Cape Town
Year of death missing
19th-century South African women writers
Human rights activists
South African activists